The franc is any of various units of currency. One franc is typically divided into 100 centimes. The name is said to derive from the Latin inscription francorum rex (King of the Franks) used on  early French coins  and until the 18th century, or from the French franc, meaning "frank" (and "free" in certain contexts, such as coup franc, "free kick").

The countries that use francs today include Switzerland, Liechtenstein, and most of Francophone Africa. The Swiss franc is a major world currency today due to the prominence of Swiss financial institutions.

Before the introduction of the euro in 1999, francs were also used in France, Belgium and Luxembourg, while Andorra and Monaco accepted the French franc as legal tender (Monégasque franc). The franc was also used within the French Empire's colonies, including Algeria and Cambodia. The franc is sometimes Italianised or Hispanicised as the franco, for instance in Luccan franco.

Origins

The franc was originally a French gold coin of 3.87 g minted in 1360 on the occasion of the release of King John II ("the Good"), held by the English since his capture at the Battle of Poitiers four years earlier. It was equivalent to one livre tournois (Tours pound).

French franc
The French franc was originally a gold coin issued in France from 1360 until 1380, then a silver coin issued between 1575 and 1641. The franc finally became the national currency from 1795 until 1999 (franc coins and notes were legal tender until 2002).  Though abolished as a legal coin by King Louis XIII in 1641 in favor of the gold louis and silver écu, the term franc continued to be used in common parlance for the livre tournois.  The franc was also minted for many of the former French colonies, such as Morocco, Algeria, French West Africa, and others.  Today, after independence, many of these countries continue to use the franc as their standard denomination.

The value of the French franc was locked to the euro at 1 euro = 6.55957 FRF on 31 December 1998, and after the introduction of the euro notes and coins, ceased to be legal tender after 28 February 2002, although they were still exchangeable at banks until 19 February 2012.

CFA and CFP francs
Fourteen African countries use the franc CFA (in west Africa, Communauté financière africaine; in equatorial Africa, Coopération financière en Afrique centrale), originally (1945) worth 1.7 French francs and then from 1948, 2 francs (from 1960: 0.02 new franc) but after January 1994 worth only 0.01 French franc. Therefore, from January 1999, 1 CFA franc is equivalent to €0.00152449. On 22 December 2019, it was announced that the CFA franc would be replaced in 2020 by an independent currency to be called Eco.

A separate (franc CFP) circulates in France's Pacific territories, worth €0.0084 (formerly 0.055 French franc).

Comorian franc
In 1981, The Comoros established an arrangement with the French government similar to that of the CFA franc.  Originally, 50 Comorian francs were worth 1 French franc.  In January 1994, the rate was changed to 75 Comorian francs to the French franc.  Since 1999, the currency has been pegged to the euro.

Belgian franc and Luxembourgish franc

The conquest of most of western Europe by Revolutionary and Napoleonic France led to the franc's wide circulation. Following independence from the Kingdom of the Netherlands, the new Kingdom of Belgium in 1832 adopted its own Belgian franc, equivalent to the French one, followed by Luxembourg adopting the Luxembourgish franc in 1848 and Switzerland in 1850. Newly unified Italy adopted the lira on a similar basis in 1862.

In the 1870s the gold value was made the fixed standard, a situation which was to continue until 1914.

In 1926 Belgium as well as France experienced depreciation and an abrupt collapse of confidence, leading to the introduction of a new gold currency for international transactions, the belga of 5 francs, and the country's withdrawal from the monetary union, which ceased to exist at the end of the year. The 1921 monetary union of Belgium and Luxembourg survived, however, forming the basis for full economic union in 1932.

Like the French franc, the Belgo-Luxemburgish franc ceased to exist on 1 January 1999, when it became fixed at 1 EUR = 40.3399 BEF/LUF, thus a franc was worth €0.024789.  Old franc coins and notes lost their legal tender status on 28 February 2002.

1 Luxembourgish franc was equal to 1 Belgian franc. Belgian francs were legal tender inside Luxembourg, and Luxembourgish francs were legal tender in the whole of Belgium. (In reality, Luxembourgish francs were only accepted as means of payment by shops and businesses in the Belgian province of Luxembourg adjacent to the independent Grand Duchy of Luxembourg, this for historical reasons.)

The equivalent name of the Belgian franc in Dutch, Belgium's other official language, was Belgische Frank. As mentioned before, in Luxembourg the franc was called Frang (plural Frangen).

Swiss franc and Liechtenstein franc
The Swiss franc (ISO code: CHF or 756), which appreciated significantly against the new European currency from April to September 2000, remains one of the world's strongest currencies, worth today around five-sixths of a euro. The Swiss franc is used in Switzerland and in Liechtenstein. Liechtenstein retains the ability to mint its own currency, the Liechtenstein franc, which it does from time to time for commemorative or emergency purposes.

The name of the country "Swiss Confederation" is found on some of the coins in Latin (Confoederatio Helvetica), as Switzerland has four official languages, all of which are used on the notes. The denomination is abbreviated "Fr." on the coins which is the abbreviation in all four languages.

Saar franc
The Saar franc, linked at par to the French franc, was introduced in the Saar Protectorate in 1948.  On 1 January 1957, the territory joined the Federal Republic of Germany, nevertheless, in its new member state of Saarland, the Saar franc continued to be the currency until 6 July 1959.

The name of the Saar franc in German, the main official language in the Protectorate, was Franken. Coins displaying German inscriptions and the coat of arms of the Protectorate were circulated and used together with French francs.  As banknotes, only French franc bills existed.

Countries that use a franc

Countries currently using a franc

Current

Collectivities   franc

Defunct

See also

Cape Verdean escudo
Latin Monetary Union
 The Latverian franc is the currency of the fictional country of Latveria.
Special settlement currencies
UIC franc
Gold franc
Livre tournois (French pound)
Roman currency
New Hebrides franc
Westphalian frank
Reunion franc

References

External links

Swiss Franc Tracker - CHF

 
Currencies of Europe
Denominations (currency)